Fioravanti is a fruit-flavored, carbonated soft drink first sold in 1878 in Ecuador. It is notable for being one of the first soft drinks commercially sold. In 1991, it was acquired by The Coca-Cola Company.

Flavors
Fioravanti was first available in strawberry flavor, and later in apple flavor. In the summer of 2001, a grape flavor was added, which lasted around 1 year before being discontinued. There was a Fiora Manzana Verde (green apple), with a strong green color, but this did not succeed in the Ecuadorian market.

In Ecuador, the drinking of Fioravanti, often shortened to Fiora, has become a part of popular culture . It is commonly known as Fiora fresa (strawberry) or Fiora Manzana (apple).

Due to the high number of Ecuadorian immigrants in Spain, Coca-Cola has decided to bring strawberry-flavored Fioravanti to Spain, for a three-month test starting in mid-October 2006.

See also
 List of Ecuadorian dishes and foods

References

External links 
 The Coca-Cola Virtual Vender
Go to > South America > Ecuador > Fioravanti

Cola brands
Carbonated drinks
Coca-Cola brands
Fruit sodas
1878 introductions
Ecuadorian cuisine